Vinyl is the fourth album by an alternative rock group Dramarama, released in 1991. It is a celebration of classic rock with Mick Taylor, formerly of The Rolling Stones, playing guitar on all tracks, including, ironically, a Stones song.

Critical reception
Alternative Rock wrote that the sound of the album was "steeped in the Southern rock tradition of R&B riffery, bluesy guitar leads, and a whiff of C&W."

Track listing
All songs written by John Easdale, except for where noted. 
 "Until the Next Time" – 3:29
 "Haven't Got a Clue" – 4:08
 "What Are We Gonna Do?" – 3:59
 "Classic Rot" – 4:25
 "Memo from Turner" (Mick Jagger, Keith Richards) – 3:46
 "Train Going Backwards" – 6:17
 "I've Got Spies" – 4:34
 "In Quiet Rooms" – 2:40
 "Ain't It the Truth" – 3:50
 "Tiny Candles" – 6:32
 "(I'd Like to) Volunteer, Please" – 5:51
 "Steve Is Here" - 1:08 [hidden track indexed as tracks 12-99]

Personnel

Mick Taylor – guitar
Benmont Tench – piano & organ
Jim Keltner – drums
 Brian Macleod – drums
 Astrid Young - backing vocals

References 

Dramarama albums
1991 albums
Elektra Records albums